Vietnam Maritime University is a university in Haiphong operated by the Ministry of Transport. The university was established on 1 April 1956 as Haiphong Maritime University. , this is the only maritime university in Vietnam. The university has over 1000 staffs, of which, 450 are faculty staffs. The university provides undergraduate and graduate education of shipbuilding, maritime navigation, nautical technology. It has a second campus in Vung Tau city.

History 
As established on April 1, 1956 at scale of vocational school.

Nowadays, the University is educating 31 undergraduate majors, 11 majors at master level, 8 majors at doctorate level with the total number of 25.959 full-time students; 983 lecturers and administrative staffs. In which, there are 27 Professors, 91 D.Sc & Ph.D. and 494 M.Sc., 338 Captains and Chief Engineers and hundreds of qualified maritime officers and seafarers.

Prof.Dr. Phạm Xuân Dương - Acting President of VMU

Faculties
Faculty of Maritime Navigation (Khoa Hàng Hải)
Faculty of Ship Machinery (Khoa Máy tàu biển)
Faculty of Electricity and Electronic Engineering (Khoa Điện - Điện tử)
Faculty of Shipbuilding (Khoa Đóng tàu)
Faculty of Mechanical Engineering (Viện cơ khí)
Faculty of Navigational Business (Khoa Kinh tế vận tải biển)
Faculty of Structural Engineering (Khoa Công trình)
Faculty of IT (Khoa Công nghệ thông tin)
Faculty of Foreign Studies (Khoa Ngoại ngữ)
Faculty of International School of Education (Viện đào tạo quốc tế - ISE)
Faculty of Environment Engineering (Viện Môi trường)
Faculty of Finance Management (Khoa Quản trị - Tài chính)
Faculty of Postgraduate (Viện đào tạo sau đại học)
VMU Maritime Vocational College (Trường Cao đẳng nghề VMU)

International School of Education 

Introduction: International Training Institute under the Maritime University, the English name is: International School of Education, referred to as the ISE function: Organize and manage projects with joint training foreign; imports of advanced programs; support students to study abroad and international student exchanges; supply human resources and implement collaborative scientific research.
International Training Institute includes two majors: the maritime economy and globalization, international business and logistics.
International Training Institute has the following tasks:
 Organization and implementation of joint training program universities, graduate school or institute (as authorized by the School) signed with universities or educational institutions abroad.
 Management of advanced training programs at the University.
 Equipped with foreign language skills and prepare human resources to meet the requirements of the training program of international cooperation.
 Links to organizations, institutions and foreign implementation of short-term training programs and certification of knowledge, expertise and professional in the field of science and technology, education, and business management.
 Organize or co-organized conferences, seminars domestically and internationally about the contents of the field activities of the Institute.
 Join, advice, propose solutions for the problems caused by the need for economic development, social set out in the fields of a activities of the Institute.
 studying counseling services for organizations and individuals in need.
 Perform other duties as assigned by the Principal.
Speaking at the decision announced Dr. Liang Gong Me - Party Secretary, Rector assigned for International Training Institute have developed policies, and quickly drafting rules work to the approval of the Principal, search personnel could meet the mission requirements of the Institute and parallel to it, the service continues to perform well. Principal desirable in future international training institute will develop better meet the trust of leadership, staff, teachers and school employees.
ISE
After nearly two years of operation, the Institute of International Education has been gradually collaborative effort with universities in the world in which international training institute is developing joint training program with the following partners:

University of Applied Sciences (IMC) - Krems, Austria
University of Applied Sciences and IMC, Krems is the private schools in the system of Higher Education and Postgraduate top of the Republic of Austria, the system links more than 100 universities and training in 9 languages with special programs at the University and postgraduate. Where there are more than 2,000 students in Austria and thousands of students from other countries are studying and looking for career development opportunities to participate in an intensive training program with international standards of IMC-Krems .
Training Program Master of Management degree by the University of Science and Application IMC, Krems by the Institute of International Education - Vietnam Maritime University undertook implementation will soon be deployed in the near future .

In addition, the Institute of International Education study advice, offer scholarships University, Graduate School, organized the exchange program students and Students majoring in "Maritime Economics and Globalization" is equipped with the following knowledge:

Vietnam Maritime University.
Khảo sát đồng phục sinh viên viện đào tạo quốc tế.

References

Buildings and structures in Haiphong
Government of Vietnam
Haiphong
Maritime colleges
Transport in Vietnam
Universities in Vietnam